Patricia A. Duffy is a Massachusetts state representative for the 5th Hampden District seat which includes Holyoke. She was born in California and moved to Massachusetts aged eight.

Political career
Duffy was elected in 2020. She won a three-way Democratic primary in 2020 then faced no Republican challenger in the general. Before running she was the legislative aid to her predecessor Aaron Vega. In 2002 she ran for and lost the state representative seat in the 2nd Hampshire seat.

Committees
 House Committee on Global Warming and Climate Change
 Joint Committee on Cannabis Policy
 Joint Committee on Health Care Financing
 Joint Committee on Higher Education
 Joint Committee on Veterans and Federal Affairs

See also
 2021–2022 Massachusetts legislature

References 

 Biography on MALegislature.gov

External links
 Legislative website
 Campaign website

Democratic Party members of the Massachusetts House of Representatives
Living people
People from Hampden, Massachusetts
1963 births